TL Forsberg (born 8 September  in Nova Scotia, Canada) is a Canadian hard of hearing singer, songwriter and actress who proudly embraces the word "deaf" She is a graduate of George Brown Theatre School, Forsberg performed as the singer/front person for the band KRIYA which opened for Alanis Morissette and Tori Amos at the Molson Canadian Amphitheatre in 1999.  Forsberg, is perhaps most known for her candidacy as the hard of hearing singer as one of four subjects, along with CJ Jones, Bob Hilterman, Robert De Mayo profiled in the 2010 award-winning documentary See What I'm Saying: The Deaf Entertainers Documentary.

As an actress she starred in the short film Simone.

She also performed the role of Magician Assistant in a 2009 Deaf West/Center Theater Group production of Pippin at the Mark Taper Forum.

Other TV/Film: Out of Step, Exhibit A: Secret of Forensic Science, Fight for Justice, His Bodyguard, Falcone, Hendrix, La Femme Nikita, and Earth: The Final Conflict.

As a musical performer and fashion stylist, Forsberg appeared opposite rockers Sebastian Bach (Skid Row), Scott Ian (Anthrax), Evan Sienfeld (Biohazard), and Ted Nugent on VH1's reality TV series Supergroup. Her performances were featured on Much Music, MTV (Fuse), The New Music and City TV, Ozzfest 2006, San Diego's 105.3 Rock Radio and Hollywoodmusic.tv.

Recently she performed ASL musical translations with rappers Cee-Lo and T-Pain on FUSE TV's production "Lay it Down" and on NBC's Season Two of The Voice performing opposite opera singer and finalist Chris Mann.

Forsberg is most known to date for her portrayal of Olivia, Camryn's stunning alternative hard of hearing girlfriend, on ABC's hit TV series, Switched at Birth.

Forsberg resides in Los Angeles.

References

External links 
 TL Forsberg website
 Follow TL on Twitter
 TL's Facebook Fan Page
 
 Interview of TL Forsberg on her starring in Simone
 See What I'm Saying – HD Music Video from Deaf Entertainers Documentary
 See What I'm Saying – trailer
 TL Forsberg, Deaf singer and star of the movie "Do You See What I'm Saying?" interviewed by Sheena McFeely, the host of the Pearls

Year of birth missing (living people)
American deaf actresses
American stage actresses
American women rock singers
Living people
American television actresses
Canadian emigrants to the United States
Actresses from Nova Scotia
Musicians from Nova Scotia
Fashion stylists
21st-century American women